Nest-Sotra Fotball is a Norwegian association football club from Sotra, Hordaland. In 2020, their elite license was taken over by the new club Øygarden FK, which is a cooperation between Øygarden clubs Nordre Fjell, Sund SK, Skogsvåg IL, Telavåg IL, Skjergard IL and Nest-Sotra.

The club was founded on 1 January 1968, and its team colors are green and white. Its traditional base is in Skålvik, but it now plays its matches at Ågotnes Stadion in Ågotnes.

History
The club was founded in 1968 by members of IL Øygard. These members protested against the IL Øygard board's decision regarding who should become the club's new head coach and therefore created a new club called IL Nest. Karstein Lunde was elected as IL Nest's first chairman. The name was changed to IL Nest-Sotra in 1994. They did not play in the league system before 1972 when they lost their debut game 2–3 against Laksevåg TIL.

The team played in the 2. divisjon between 1995 and 1998 and from 2001 to 2003 and after a few years in lower leagues, the team again played in the 2. divisjon in 2008. The club won promotion to the 1. divisjon for the first time in 2013. In 2019, Nest-Sotra decided that their elite license, from 2020 and onwards, will be taken over by the new club Øygarden FK, which is a cooperation between Nordre Fjell, Sund SK, Skogsvåg IL, Telavåg IL, Skjergard IL and Nest-Sotra. The decision was announced by the club on 26 September 2019 and among the reasons for their decision was the club's lack of financial control. During the 2019 season, Nest-Sotra were deducted a total of four points due to financial difficulties.

Recent seasons
{|class="wikitable"
|-bgcolor="#efefef"
! Season
! 
! Pos.
! Pl.
! W
! D
! L
! GS
! GA
! P
!Cup
!Notes
|-
|2001
|2. divisjon
|align=right |11
|align=right|26||align=right|9||align=right|4||align=right|13
|align=right|49||align=right|51||align=right|31
|Third round
|
|-
|2002
|2. divisjon
|align=right |6
|align=right|26||align=right|12||align=right|2||align=right|12
|align=right|48||align=right|63||align=right|38
|Second round
|
|-
|2003
|2. divisjon
|align=right bgcolor="#FFCCCC"| 12
|align=right|26||align=right|8||align=right|5||align=right|13
|align=right|40||align=right|48||align=right|29
|Third round
|Relegated to the 3. divisjon
|-
|2004
|3. divisjon
|align=right |1
|align=right|22||align=right|16||align=right|4||align=right|2
|align=right|86||align=right|24||align=right|52
|Second qualifying round
|Lost play-offs for promotion
|-
|2005
|3. divisjon
|align=right |2
|align=right|22||align=right|17||align=right|1||align=right|4
|align=right|79||align=right|25||align=right|52
|First qualifying round
|
|-
|2006
|3. divisjon
|align=right |2
|align=right|22||align=right|17||align=right|1||align=right|4
|align=right|80||align=right|31||align=right|52
|First qualifying round
|
|-
|2007
|3. divisjon
|align=right bgcolor=#DDFFDD| 1
|align=right|22||align=right|19||align=right|3||align=right|0
|align=right|79||align=right|25||align=right|60
|First qualifying round
|Promoted to the 2. divisjon
|-
|2008
|2. divisjon
|align=right |10
|align=right|26||align=right|8||align=right|7||align=right|11
|align=right|46||align=right|52||align=right|31
|First round
|
|-
|2009
|2. divisjon
|align=right |10
|align=right|26||align=right|8||align=right|5||align=right|13
|align=right|51||align=right|77||align=right|29
|Third round
|
|-
|2010
|2. divisjon
|align=right |4
|align=right|26||align=right|14||align=right|4||align=right|8
|align=right|54||align=right|50||align=right|46
|Second round
| 
|-
|2011
|2. divisjon
|align=right |9
|align=right|26||align=right|9||align=right|6||align=right|11
|align=right|51||align=right|45||align=right|33
|First round
| 
|-
|2012
|2. divisjon
|align=right |4
|align=right|26||align=right|12||align=right|3||align=right|11
|align=right|50||align=right|47||align=right|39
|Third round
|
|-
|2013
|2. divisjon
|align=right bgcolor=#DDFFDD| 1
|align=right|26||align=right|20||align=right|3||align=right|3
|align=right|70||align=right|24||align=right|63
|Second round
|Promoted to the 1. divisjon
|-
|2014 
|1. divisjon
|align=right |12
|align=right|30||align=right|10||align=right|7||align=right|13
|align=right|49||align=right|51||align=right|37
||Second round
|
|-
|2015 
|1. divisjon
|align=right bgcolor="#FFCCCC"|14
|align=right|30||align=right|8||align=right|7||align=right|15
|align=right|41||align=right|51||align=right|31
||Second round
|Relegated to the 2. divisjon
|-
|2016 
|2. divisjon
|align=right |2
|align=right|26||align=right|19||align=right|4||align=right|3
|align=right|83||align=right|26||align=right|61
||Fourth round
|
|-
|2017 
|2. divisjon
|align=right bgcolor=#DDFFDD| 1
|align=right|26||align=right|15||align=right|9||align=right|2
|align=right|60||align=right|22||align=right|54
||Third round
|Promoted to the 1. divisjon
|-
|2018 
|1. divisjon
|align=right |6
|align=right|30||align=right|12||align=right|7||align=right|11
|align=right|43||align=right|41||align=right|43
||Third round
|Lost play-offs for promotion
|-
|2019 
|1. divisjon
|align=right |7
|align=right|30||align=right|14||align=right|6||align=right|10
|align=right|43||align=right|31||align=right|44
||Third round
|
|}

Head coaches

References

External links
 Official site 

 
Sport in Hordaland
Association football clubs established in 1968
1968 establishments in Norway